Mosul Province may refer to:
 Nineveh Governorate in modern Iraq
 Mosul Province, Ottoman Empire